may refer to:
radical 70
square, rectangle
a compass direction
kata, a respectful form of address in honorific speech in Japanese